was the former Imperial university of Japan, founded at the end of the 7th century. The Daigaku-ryō predates the Heian period, continuing in various forms through the early Meiji period. The director of the Daigaku-ryō was called the Daigaku-no-kami.

The Daigaku-ryō was located near the Suzaku Mon at southern border of Kyoto's grid. In the 12th century, the original structure was destroyed by fire, and it was not rebuilt.

Ritsuryō organization
The Daigaku-ryō was reorganized in 701. Among other duties, this ministry collected and maintained  biographical archives of meritorious subjects, and those who would carry out the functions of the ministry were trained at the Daigaku-ryō.

The  was responsible for the examination of students and the celebration of festivals associated with Confucius and his disciples.

Educational authorities associated with the Daigaku-ryō included: 
 .
 .
 .
 .
  -- two positions.
  -- two positions.
  -- two positions.

History
Prince Yamabe (who later became Emperor Kanmu) was Daigaku-no-kami in 766 (Tenpyō-jingo 2).

The institution had become a hollow shell by the Engi era  (901-923), but its fortunes revived somewhat under the patronage of Emperor Daigo.

 May 27, 1177 (Angen 3, 28th day, 4th month): A fire burned the university structure to ashes.

See also
 Yushima Seidō
 Taixue, the highest rank of educational establishment in Ancient China between the Han Dynasty and Sui Dynasty

Notes

References
 Nussbaum, Louis-Frédéric and Käthe Roth. (2005).  Japan encyclopedia. Cambridge: Harvard University Press. ;  OCLC 58053128
 Ponsonby-Fane, Richard. (1956). Kyoto: The Old Capital of Japan, 794–1869. Kyoto: The Ponsonby Memorial Society.  
 Sansom, George Bailey. (1932). "Early Japanese Law and Administration," Transactions of the Asiatic Society of Japan. Tokyo: Kegan Paul Trench Trubner & Co. OCLC 254862976
 Titsingh, Isaac. (1834).  Annales des empereurs du Japon (Nihon Odai Ichiran).  Paris: Royal Asiatic Society, Oriental Translation Fund of Great Britain and Ireland. OCLC 5850691

Education in Japan